The Farrer Memorial Agricultural High School is a government boys' academically selective and specialist secondary day and boarding school, located in Calala, a small suburb of Tamworth, in the New England region of New South Wales, Australia. It is the only public agricultural high school for boys in Australia.

Established in 1939, the school enrolled approximately 580 students in 2018, from Year 7 to Year 12, of whom eleven percent identified as Indigenous Australians and two percent were from a language background other than English. The school is operated by the NSW Department of Education; the principal is Clint Gallagher.

Overview 
Established in 1939, Farrer is one of the few agricultural secondary schools catering for both boarding and day students. , the school enrolled approximately 610 students from Year 7 to Year 12, including 360 boarders, making it the third largest boarding school in the State. Being a public high School, tuition is free, and the school charges the lowest boarding fees in New South Wales.

While an emphasis is placed on the agricultural curriculum, but a broad curriculum is also on offer for students from rural NSW who do not wish to return to the land or gain employment in an agricultural field. Other areas of emphasis at Farrer include sport and student welfare.

Farrer embodies a conservative culture with a high degree of inclusiveness of Ethnicity and Disabilities. School uniform is compulsory and is traditional in style, including blazer, tie and wide-brimmed hat. The school marches each week as part of the school assembly, and a prefect system is in place, playing an important role in the welfare and supervision of students.

History
Farrer Memorial High School was founded in 1939 by Sir William Farrer as an agricultural high school for boarders, particularly those who are isolated and day students from the Tamworth region.

The school was named in memory of William James Farrer (1845–1906), a leading Australian agronomist and wheat breeder, best known for developing the "Federation" breed of wheat. His work led to significant increases in the Australian wheat crop for decades to come, and economic prosperity for the wheat industry.

Campus

The school's facilities include computer rooms, TAS workshops, a 200-seat auditorium, Old Boys' museum and multiple facilities to teach practical agriculture, such as a  farm, horticultural centre and piggery. The dairy cattle, White Suffolk sheep flock and Angus cattle stud are run as profitable business ventures, turning over in excess of A$140,000 at the Bull Sale in 2005.

The school's sporting facilities include a gymnasium, swimming pool, weights room, tennis courts, basketball courts, football fields and a cricket oval with practice nets. The school also makes use of the city's sporting facilities, including the synthetic hockey surface and athletics track.

Curriculum
Students at Farrer have the opportunity to undertake study in a number of areas from their School Certificate in Years 9 and 10, through to their NSW Higher School Certificate (HSC) in Years 11 and 12. Some of these subject areas on offer include: industrial tech metal, industrial tech wood, electronics, information and software technology, art, music, drama, software design and development, beef production, sheep production, sport science and journalism.

Agricultural opportunities include beef cattle, sheep, dairy cattle, wool husbandry, horticulture, pig production, egg growing, dry land and irrigated cropping. Agriculture at Farrer is mandatory for years 7 to 10.

Sack system
In years past, a "sack" was a student in lower years, particularly years 7–10.  Such students were at the beck and call of students in higher years, particularly year 12, to labour at menial tasks such as shining boots, fetching food or creating confetti with a paper hole punch.  The name "sack" was said to be derived from the idea that younger years were a load to carry, as a sack.

The power was not restricted to year 12. Students of any year higher than another were empowered to issue such commands.  For example, a year 8 boy could make demands of a year 7 boy.  In this respect, the sack system may differ from the English practice of fagging.

Failure to comply on the part of a "sack" was often disciplined with corporal punishment from the year 12 students.  This punishment commonly took the form of being struck on the backside with a broom, occasionally without pants.  Active resistance to the system was met with ongoing intimidation, assault and bullying from many members of the school community, including the principal.

This punishment resulted in the interesting linguistic twist of the word broom being used as a verb.  For example, "Tell that sack to get on with it or he's going to get broomed".

The school has now admitted in court that this system existed and that it failed to implement adequate control.

Notable alumni

Alumni of Farrer Memorial Agricultural High School are known as Old Boys, and may elect to join the school's alumni association, the Farrer Old Boys' Association. The Old Boys' network totals approximately 4,000 members. Some notable Farrer Old Boys include:

Business
* Geoffrey Lee Miller principal of GCM Strategic Services Pty Limited; Chair of Farmshed Ventures Pty Ltd, and Beeline Technologies Inc. (USA); Chair of the Board of Trustees of the International Food Policy Research Institute (Washington, D.C.); Director of Agrilink, Agsystems Pty Ltd, and JEM Bonds Ltd; Chair of Value Added Wheat CRC Ltd

Entertainment, media and the arts
* Pixie Jenkinsmusician; Golden Guitar winning fiddler
;Politics, public service and the law
 Mark Coultonpolitician; Member for Parkes
 Adam Marshallpolitician; Member for Northern Tablelands
 Tony Windsorformer politician; represented New England

Sport
 George Bartonsport shooter who represented Australia at the Athens and Beijing Olympics
* Tom Learoyd-Lahrsrugby league player for the Brisbane Broncos and Canberra Raiders
 Matthew Smithhockey player who represented Australia at the Atlanta Olympics
 Richard Swainrugby league player for the Hunter Mariners, Melbourne Storm, Brisbane Broncos and the New Zealand national side
 Peter Taylorrugby league player for the South Sydney Rabbitohs
 Alan Tonguerugby league player; former captain of the Canberra Raiders
 Peter Worsleyrifle shooter who represented Australia at the Atlanta, Sydney and Athens Paralympics

See also

List of government schools in New South Wales
List of selective high schools in New South Wales
List of boarding schools in Australia
Schools in Tamworth, New South Wales

References

External links
Farrer Memorial Agricultural High School website

Buildings and structures in Tamworth, New South Wales
Educational institutions established in 1939
Boarding schools in New South Wales
Australian schools providing vocational education
Boys' schools in New South Wales
Selective schools in New South Wales
Public high schools in New South Wales
Agricultural schools
1939 establishments in Australia